The 2010 Abierto Internacional Varonil Casablanca Cancún was a professional tennis tournament played on clay courts. It was the third edition of the tournament which is part of the 2010 ATP Challenger Tour. It took place in Cancún, Mexico between 15 and 21 November 2010.

ATP entrants

Seeds

 Rankings are as of November 8, 2010.

Other entrants
The following players received wildcards into the singles main draw:
  Daniel Garza
  César Ramírez
  Ty Trombetta
  Mark Verryth

The following players received entry as an alternate into the singles main draw:
  Iván Endara

The following players received entry from the qualifying draw:
  Benjamin Balleret
  Thomas Cazes-Carrère (LL)
  Leonardo Kirche
  Axel Michon
  Pedro Sousa

Champions

Singles

 Pere Riba def.  Carlos Berlocq, 6–4, 6–0

Doubles

 Víctor Estrella /  Santiago González def.  Rainer Eitzinger /  César Ramírez, 6–1, 7–6(3)

External links
Official Website
ITF Search 
ATP official site

Abierto Internacional Varonil Casablanca Cancun
Abierto Internacional Varonil Casablanca Cancún
Cancún
2010 in Mexican tennis